Brandon James Garbe (born February 3, 1981 in Moses Lake, Washington) is an American former minor league baseball player. In 1999, Garbe won the Gatorade High School Baseball Player of the Year Award.

Draft and professional career
Garbe was selected fifth overall by the Minnesota Twins in the 1999 amateur draft out of Moses Lake High School. He began his professional career that season, hitting .316 in 41 games for the Elizabethton Twins. That would be the only time he'd ever hit above .275 in a professional season.

In 2000, he hit only .233 in 133 games for the Quad Cities River Bandits, and in 2001 he hit only .242 in 127 games for the Fort Myers Miracle. With the Miracle again in 2002, he hit only .239 in 115 games.

Garbe split the 2003 season between the GCL Twins (eight games) and New Britain Rock Cats (66 games), hitting a combined .181. He began the 2004 season with the Rock Cats, hitting .201 in 114 games with them. On August 31, he was traded to the Seattle Mariners for Pat Borders. He spent three games in the Mariners organization that year, hitting .375 in nine at-bats with the San Antonio Missions. He hit .204 overall that year.

In 2005, Garbe hit .275 in 80 games for the Inland Empire 66ers. He wound up in the Florida Marlins organization in 2006, hitting .184 in 35 games with the Carolina Mudcats.

Overall, he hit .235 in 722 games over an eight-year career.

External links

Living people
1981 births
Elizabethton Twins players
Quad Cities River Bandits players
Fort Myers Miracle players
New Britain Rock Cats players
Gulf Coast Twins players
San Antonio Missions players
Inland Empire 66ers of San Bernardino players
Carolina Mudcats players
Baseball players from Washington (state)
Minor league baseball players